Debt service may refer to:

Interest payable on debt, especially on government debt
Debt service ratio 
Debt service coverage ratio 
External debt 
Developing countries' debt 
Credit analysis
Bureau of the Public Debt